Hockey Club Sparta Praha, commonly known as  HC Sparta Prague, is a Prague-based Czech ice hockey team playing in the Czech Extraliga. The club has won four Czech championships (most recently in 2007) and four Czechoslovak championships, as well as two Spengler Cups, making it one of the most successful hockey clubs in Czech history. The team HC Sparta Praha plays its home games at O2 Arena, the largest arena in the country. 

. Founded in 1903, Sparta is one of the oldest hockey teams in the world.

Milestones
 Founded: The club was originally formed in 1903 as a bandy club and then transformed into a hockey club in 1909.
 Best finishes: National champions of Czechoslovakia: 1952–53, 1953–54, 1989–90, 1992–93.  National champions of the Czech Republic: 1999–00, 2001–02, 2005–06, 2006–07
 Worst finishes: Czechoslovakia: 8th place (1972–73, 1980–81, 1982–83, 1985–86), Czech Republic: 12th place (2010–11).

Highest national league participation: From the league foundation in 1936 to 1950 and from 1951 up to this day.

International achievements: Spengler Cup winner in 1962, 1963, Spengler Cup 2nd place in 2004, European League 2nd place 2000, European Champions Cup 2nd place in 2008, Champions Hockey League 2nd place 2017.
Club colours: Blue, yellow and red. Starting in the 2001–02 season, club jerseys used a combination of black, white and grey. Since the 2005–06 season, jerseys have regularly been burgundy and white.

History

The HC Sparta Praha hockey club is one of the oldest hockey clubs in the world and one of the most successful and famous clubs in Czechoslovak and later Czech ice hockey history.

Sparta's great successes were reached in the years following World War II as it won two national titles in a row (1952/53 and 1953/54) under the name Spartak Sokolovo. The next highly successful period came much more recently when Sparta won the national league in 1989/90 and again in 1992/93. Another recent achievement (along with two third-place finishes in 1995/96 and 1996/97) was Sparta's participation in the final group of the European League (EHL) in 1996/97.

After a few unsuccessful years, Sparta returned to the top of the Czech Extraliga in 1999/00 when they were crowned league champions. That victory was the first of four championships they would win over seven seasons, adding Extraliga titles in 2001/02, 2005/06 and 2006/07. In addition to those achievements, Sparta managed to be finish second two times in European team competitions – 1999/00 European Hockey League and 2016–17 Champions Hockey League.

Present
HC Sparta Praha has regularly been one of the best teams in the Czech Extraliga, making the playoffs almost every year. HC Sparta Praha's home games are played at O2 Arena which is the largest hockey arena in the Czech Republic with a capacity of over 17,300 spectators. They moved there from the Tipsport Arena in 2015.

Club logo

Honours

Domestic

Czech Extraliga
  Winners (4): 1999–00, 2001–02, 2005–06, 2006–07
  Runners-up (3): 2000–01, 2015–16, 2021–22
  3rd place (7): 1995–96, 1996–97, 2002–03, 2003–04, 2008–09, 2013–14, 2020–21

Czechoslovak Extraliga
  Winners (4): 1952–53, 1953–54, 1989–90, 1992–93
  Runners-up (7): 1936–37, 1937–38, 1956–57, 1962–63, 1966–67, 1973–74, 1987–88
  3rd place (6): 1955–56, 1960–61, 1964–65, 1967–68, 1976–77, 1986–87

Bohemian-Moravian League
  3rd place (4): 1939–40, 1940–41, 1941–42, 1942–43

International
Spengler Cup
  Winners (2): 1962, 1963
  Runners-up (2): 2004, 2022

Tatra Cup
  Winners (5): 1935/1936, 1950/1951, 1958/1959, 1959/1960, 1980

IIHF European Champions Cup
  Runners-up (1): 2008

European Hockey League
  Runners-up (1): 1999–00

Champions Hockey League
  Runners-up (1): 2016–17

Pre-season
Tipsport Hockey Cup
  Winners (2): 2001, 2009
  Runners-up (1): 2003

Players

Current roster

References

External links

 

 
Praha, Sparta
Ice hockey teams in the Czech Republic
Sport in Prague
Bandy clubs established in 1903
Ice hockey clubs established in 1903
1903 establishments in Austria-Hungary
20th-century establishments in Bohemia
Bandy clubs
AC Sparta Prague